Ål Mats Arne Larsson (born 20 March 1980) is a Swedish cross-country skier who has raced since 1999. He won a bronze medal in the 4 × 10 km relay and finished 20th in the 15 km event at the 2006 Winter Olympics in Turin.

Larsson won a silver medal in the individual sprint event at the 2007 FIS Nordic World Ski Championships in Sapporo. His only career win came in a 15 km event in 2002 in Italy.

In May 2013, he was appointed as a coach for the Swedish national cross-country ski team. His father Gunnar was also an Olympic cross-country skier.

Cross-country skiing results
All results are sourced from the International Ski Federation (FIS).

Olympic Games
 1 medal – (1 bronze)

World Championships
 1 medal – (1 silver)

World Cup

Season standings

Individual podiums
 4 podiums – (3 , 1 )

Team podiums
 1 victory – (1 ) 
 7 podiums – (4 , 3 )

See also
List of Olympic medalist families

References

External links

 
 

1980 births
Living people
People from Vansbro Municipality
Cross-country skiers from Dalarna County
Swedish male cross-country skiers
Cross-country skiers at the 2006 Winter Olympics
Olympic cross-country skiers of Sweden
Olympic bronze medalists for Sweden
Olympic medalists in cross-country skiing
FIS Nordic World Ski Championships medalists in cross-country skiing
Medalists at the 2006 Winter Olympics